

Biography
Grousset was born in Aubais, Gard in 1885.  Having graduated from the University of Montpellier with a degree in history, he began his distinguished career soon afterward.  He served in the French army during World War I.  In 1925, Grousset was appointed adjunct conservator of the Musée Guimet in Paris and secretary of the Journal asiatique.  By 1930 he had published five major works on Asiatic and Oriental civilizations.  In 1933 he was appointed director of the Cernuschi Museum in Paris and curator of its Asiatic art collections. He wrote a major work on the Chinese Buddhist medieval pilgrim Xuanzang, particularly emphasising the importance of his visit to the northern Indian Buddhist university of Nalanda.

Before the outbreak of World War II, Grousset had published his two most important works, Histoire des Croisades (1934-1936) and L'Empire des Steppes (1939).

Dismissed from his museum posts by the Vichy government, he continued his research privately and published three volumes on China and the Mongols during the war.  Following the liberation of France, he resumed his curatorship of the Cernuschi Museum and in addition was appointed curator of the Guimet Museum.  In 1946, Grousset was made a member of the Académie française.  Between 1946 and 1949, he published four final works, concentrating on Asia Minor and the Near East.

In 1952, Grousset died at the age of 67 in Paris.

Judgments 
Historian Christopher Tyerman points out that, upon publication, Grousset's History of the Crusades came under criticism, on the one hand for not analyzing the political system of what Grousset considered to be a French state in the Levant and on the other hand for exaggerating or misrepresenting the cultural sympathy between overseas communities. The American historians Frederic Duncalf and John Life La Monte were particularly severe.

In 1981, the historian Hans Eberhard Mayer estimated that Grousset's "History of the Crusades" was, among the general works on this subject, "the one in which chauvinism in crusade research raised its ugly head for a last time".

More recently, Grousset's successors have noted that his outlook was shaped by his ideas about France's colonial role. In 2001, :fr:Joël Gourdon wrote: "René Grousset produced a work entirely dedicated to France's colonial role. He sees in the colonial adventure the admirable synthesis of the most sacred values for him: Christianity, the fatherland and the State, even republican. He projects this ideal into the Middle Ages and sees in the Crusades the first expression of this 'civilizing mission' which is that of eternal France."

In 2007, the medievalist Pierre Aubé expressed himself on Grousset in the following manner: "This historian, who knew how to rely on the best of the greatest orientalists of his time, whose erudition is of a rare solidity when it comes to establishing facts, is very oriented when it comes to interpreting them. His angle of vision is very marked by the colonialist utopia that prevailed in the 1920s and 1930s when he built his opus magnum."

For :fr:Vadime Elisseeff, who succeeded him as director of the Cernuschi museum, René Grousset is "the last of the great classics, those for whom the “sense of history” was more a matter of psychology of beings than of the material conditions of existence, whose physical and moral impact on the lives of individuals had not yet been emphasized by the sciences. His works are valuable by the intelligence of the views and by facts presented in a clear and easily readable style.

Works

 1922 –  , 4 vol., Paris: G. Crès & cie.    OCLC 4594662
 1923 – 
 1924 – 
 1926 – 
 1928 – 
 1929 – 
 1929 – 
  In the Footsteps of the Buddha. JA Underwood (trans) Orion Press. New York (1971)
 1929–1930 – , 4 vol.
 1931 – 
 1934–1936 –  , 3 vol. Paris: Plon. 
 1936 – 
 1937 –  (with H. Demoulin-Bernard)
 1939 – 
 1939 –   Paris: Editions Payot. OCLC 220712631
  The Empire of the Steppes.  (tr., Naomi Walford).  New Brunswick: Rutgers University Press. (1970) ; .
 1941 – 
 1941 –  (with  J. Auboyer et J. Buhot)
 1942 – 
 1944 – 
 1945 –  (with C. DIehl, R. Guilland et L. Oeconomos)
 1946 – 
 1946 – 
 1947 –   Paris: Payot. 
 1948 – 
 1949 – 
 1950 –  (collective work)
 1950 –  (with J. Auboyer)
 1951 –

See also
 Eurasian Steppe

References 

1885 births
1952 deaths
People from Gard
Members of the Académie Française
Turkologists
Historians of Central Asia
Historians of the Crusades
French sinologists
French male non-fiction writers
20th-century French historians
20th-century French male writers